Tellier is a surname, and may refer to:

 Charles Tellier (1828–1913), French compressed air engineer
 Joseph-Mathias Tellier (1861–1952), Quebec Conservative Party
 Léon Tellier, French Olympic sailor
 Lionel Tellier (1905–1973), Canadian politician
 Louis Tellier (1842–1935), Canadian lawyer, politician, and judge 
 Maurice Tellier  (1896–1966), Canadian lawyer and politician 
 Paul Tellier (born 1939), Canadian businessperson
 Ray Tellier (born 1951), American college athletics administrator
 Sébastien Tellier (born 1975), French singer, songwriter and multi-instrumentalist
 Sylvie Tellier (born 1978), Miss Lyon 2001
 Théodule Tellier (1856–1922), French printer

Other uses
 Tellier brothers, Early French aircraft maker

See also
 Le Tellier

French-language surnames